The 2010 Melbourne Football Club season was the club's 111th year in the VFL/AFL since it began in 1897.

Melbourne played 14 games at the MCG, 10 of which were home games. They also played a home match at TIO Stadium in Darwin against Port Adelaide in Round 9. It was Dean Bailey's third year as senior coach. James McDonald continued as the club's captain until retiring at the end of the year.

They began to play a fast and exciting brand of football with heavy use of the corridor and playing-on in subsequent weeks. Furthermore, unlike the 3 previous seasons, Melbourne began to cut heavy defects back to smaller deficits by preventing their opponents from scoring. This was due to Melbourne constantly gained running momentum when moving the ball outside of their defensive 50.

Melbourne was shown strong signs of competitiveness against the sides that eventually finished in the top 8 that year.

In addition to Melbourne's promising season allowing them to achieve 8 wins and a draw with a percentage of 94.52%, it also allowed James Frawley and Mark Jamar to earn position in the 2010 All-Australian team in the back line and the interchange bench respectively.

In August, Melbourne announced it was officially debt free. The same night Melbourne also unveiled its new logo.

2010 list changes

2009 trades

Retirements and delistings

National draft

Pre-season draft

Rookie draft

2010 squad

2010 season

Pre-season

NAB Cup

Week 1

NAB Challenge

Week 2

Week 3

Week 4

Home and away season

Round 1

Round 2

Round 3

Round 4

Round 5

Round 6

Round 7

Round 8

Round 9

Round 10

Round 11

Round 12

Round 13

Round 14

Round 15

Round 16

Round 17

Round 18

Round 19

Round 20

Round 21

Round 22

Ladder

Ladder breakdown by opposition

Awards and milestones

China Tour 
Melbourne competed in the Kaspersky Cup Exhibition Match against the Brisbane Lions on 17 October in Shanghai, China winning by 5 points. Liam Jurrah kicked 5 goals in front of an estimated 5,000 crowd.

Awards

Melbourne's annual Best and Fairest night was held on 2 September, at Crown Casino. Brad Green capped off an excellent year, winning his first Keith 'Bluey' Truscott Trophy, finishing 18 votes ahead of defender James Frawley, and also winning the Ron Barassi Leadership Award and the Leading Goalkicker Award.

Best and Fairest Top Ten

Keith 'Bluey' Truscott Trophy – Brad Green

Sid Anderson Memorial Trophy (Second in the Best and Fairest) – James Frawley

Ron Barassi Snr Memorial Trophy (Third in the Best and Fairest) – Mark Jamar

Ivor Warne-Smith Memorial Trophy (Fourth in the Best and Fairest) – Aaron Davey

Dick Taylor Memorial Trophy (Fifth in the Best and Fairest) – Colin Sylvia

Harold Ball Memorial Trophy (Best First Year Player) – Tom Scully

Troy Broadbridge Trophy (highest polling MFC player in the Casey Best and Fairest) – Brad Miller

Ron Barassi Leadership Award – Brad Green

Ian Ridley Club Ambassador Award – Colin Sylvia

Norm Smith Memorial Trophy (Coach's Award) – Jordie McKenzie

Leading Goalkicker Award – Brad Green (55)

Brownlow Medal

Results

Brownlow Medal tally

References

External links
Official Website of the Melbourne Football Club
 Official Website of the AFL 

Melbourne Football Club Season, 2010
2010
Melbourne Football Club